Isomerida lineata is a species of beetle in the family Cerambycidae. It was described by Henry Walter Bates in 1874. It is known from Brazil, Bolivia, Colombia, Nicaragua and Peru.

References

Hemilophini
Beetles described in 1874